Springfield News may refer to one of the following newspapers:

 Springfield Daily News, in Springfield, Massachusetts
 Springfield News, published in Oregon from 1903 to 2006
 Springfield News, an online offering of Quest Community Newspapers in Australia
 Springfield News-Leader, in Springfield, Missouri
 Springfield News-Sun, in Springfield, Ohio

See also
 New Springfield, Ohio, an unincorporated community
 Springfield (disambiguation)